Apold is a commune in Mureș County, Transylvania, Romania. It is composed of four villages: Apold, Daia (Denndorf; Dálya or Szászdálya), Șaeș (Schaas; Segesd), and Vulcan (Wolkendorf; Volkány).

The commune is located in the southern part of the county, on the border with Brașov and Sibiu counties. Its neighbors are as follows:
West: the commune Daneș.
East: the commune Saschiz.
North: the city of Sighișoara, and the communes Albești and Vânători.
South: the commune Brădeni, in Sibiu County.
South-East: the commune Bunești, in Brașov County.

See also
List of Hungarian exonyms (Mureș County)

Gallery

References

Communes in Mureș County
Localities in Transylvania